Guy Lindsay McKenna (born 11 May 1969) is a retired Australian rules football player and the former senior coach of the Gold Coast Football Club in the Australian Football League (AFL). McKenna played 267 games for the West Coast Eagles, including the 1992 and 1994 premiership wins. He captained the club between 1999 and 2000 AFL season.

WAFL career

Playing career

West Coast Eagles
McKenna was recruited by the West Coast Eagles for the 1988 season with a pre-draft selection. He played for the Eagles from 1988 until 2000, notching up 267 games and booting 28 goals. He formed one of the most feared backlines in the AFL, along with John Worsfold, Ashley McIntosh, Glen Jakovich and Michael Brennan and was known for his cool demeanour and reliability. McKenna was also part of the club's 1992 and 1994 premiership sides.

He won the Club Champion Award twice, once in 1989 and the other in 1999, finishing in the top three another five times.

He was captain from 1998 until his retirement at the end of 2000. He kicked a memorable goal on the final kick of his career in Round 22 2000 which frenzied the crowd at Subiaco Oval.

McKenna boasts two unusual on-field distinctions from his career: In Round 20, 1994, he was the first player ever ordered from the ground under the blood rule, which had been introduced to the league that week. Then, in a match against  in Round 22, 1999, for the first time since Essendon's Jack Clarke in 1958, McKenna became the third captain in league history to call for a headcount; however, the teams were even.

Coaching career

Early career
After retiring, he coached in the West Australian Football League as senior coach of the Claremont Football Club with considerable success before moving to an assistant coaching role with the West Coast Eagles.

Collingwood Football Club assistant coach (2003–2008)
McKenna joined Collingwood Football Club at the end of 2003 as an assistant coach under senior coach Michael Malthouse his  former mentor. McKenna left the Collingwood Football Club at the end of the 2008 season.

Gold Coast Suns senior coach (2011–2014)
In 2008, McKenna was appointed the inaugural senior coach of the newly founded Gold Coast Suns Football Club. He oversaw their TAC Cup and VFL campaigns prior to their entrance in the AFL. In the 2011 season, the Gold Coast Suns under McKenna in its inaugural season in the AFL league, finished in last place on the ladder with three wins and nineteen losses for the wooden spoon. In the 2012 season, the Gold Coast suns under McKenna finished in seventeenth position (second-last) on the ladder, yet again with three wins and nineteen losses. In the 2013 season, the Gold Coast Suns under McKenna improved on-field performance when they finished fourteenth on the ladder with eight wins and fourteen losses. In the 2014 season, Gold Coast Suns under McKenna finished in twelve place on the ladder with ten wins and twelve losses. But however after the Suns failed to make the finals in their first four years in the AFL senior competition league, McKenna was sacked as senior coach of the Gold Coast Suns on 1 October 2014, at the end of the 2014 season.  McKenna was then replaced by Rodney Eade as Gold Coast Suns Football Club senior coach.

McKenna coached Gold Coast Suns Football Club to a total of 88 games with 24 wins and 64 losses to a winning percentage of 27 percent.

Essendon Football Club assistant coach (2015–2017) 
On 9 November 2015, McKenna was appointed as an assistant coach in the position of line coach at  under senior coach John Worsfold, who he previously played with as a former teammate at West Coast Eagles. McKenna left the Essendon Football Club at the end of the 2017 season.

Statistics

Playing statistics

|-
|- style="background-color: #EAEAEA"
! scope="row" style="text-align:center" | 1988
|style="text-align:center;"|
| 17 || 18 || 0 || 3 || 169 || 156 || 325 || 73 || 17 || 0.0 || 0.2 || 9.4 || 8.7 || 18.1 || 4.1 || 0.9
|-
! scope="row" style="text-align:center" | 1989
|style="text-align:center;"|
| 17 || 20 || 1 || 1 || 184 || 184 || 368 || 113 || 26 || 0.1 || 0.1 || 9.2 || 9.2 || 18.4 || 5.7 || 1.3
|- style="background-color: #EAEAEA"
! scope="row" style="text-align:center" | 1990
|style="text-align:center;"|
| 17 || 26 || 4 || 3 || 252 || 210 || 462 || 97 || 52 || 0.2 || 0.1 || 9.7 || 8.1 || 17.8 || 3.7 || 2.0
|-
! scope="row" style="text-align:center" | 1991
|style="text-align:center;"|
| 17 || 26 || 2 || 6 || 259 || 210 || 469 || 80 || 41 || 0.1 || 0.2 || 10.0 || 8.1 || 18.0 || 3.1 || 1.6
|- style="background-color: #EAEAEA"
|style="text-align:center;background:#afe6ba;"|1992†
|style="text-align:center;"|
| 17 || 12 || 2 || 2 || 91 || 95 || 186 || 37 || 22 || 0.2 || 0.2 || 7.6 || 7.9 || 15.5 || 3.1 || 1.8
|-
! scope="row" style="text-align:center" | 1993
|style="text-align:center;"|
| 17 || 21 || 1 || 1 || 199 || 165 || 364 || 92 || 39 || 0.0 || 0.0 || 9.5 || 7.9 || 17.3 || 4.4 || 1.9
|- style="background-color: #EAEAEA"
|style="text-align:center;background:#afe6ba;"|1994†
|style="text-align:center;"|
| 17 || 25 || 5 || 4 || 227 || 202 || 429 || 103 || 49 || 0.2 || 0.2 || 9.1 || 8.1 || 17.2 || 4.1 || 2.0
|-
! scope="row" style="text-align:center" | 1995
|style="text-align:center;"|
| 17 || 23 || 5 || 2 || 155 || 208 || 363 || 81 || 44 || 0.2 || 0.1 || 6.7 || 9.0 || 15.8 || 3.5 || 1.9
|- style="background-color: #EAEAEA"
! scope="row" style="text-align:center" | 1996
|style="text-align:center;"|
| 17 || 22 || 5 || 0 || 204 || 175 || 379 || 118 || 58 || 0.2 || 0.0 || 9.3 || 8.0 || 17.2 || 5.4 || 2.6
|-
! scope="row" style="text-align:center" | 1997
|style="text-align:center;"|
| 17 || 20 || 1 || 0 || 177 || 145 || 322 || 89 || 58 || 0.1 || 0.0 || 8.9 || 7.3 || 16.1 || 4.5 || 2.9
|- style="background-color: #EAEAEA"
! scope="row" style="text-align:center" | 1998
|style="text-align:center;"|
| 17 || 22 || 1 || 1 || 209 || 161 || 370 || 82 || 64 || 0.0 || 0.0 || 9.5 || 7.3 || 16.8 || 3.7 || 2.9
|-
! scope="row" style="text-align:center" | 1999
|style="text-align:center;"|
| 17 || 23 || 0 || 1 || 216 || 175 || 391 || 113 || 41 || 0.0 || 0.0 || 9.4 || 7.6 || 17.0 || 4.9 || 1.8
|- style="background-color: #EAEAEA"
! scope="row" style="text-align:center" | 2000
|style="text-align:center;"|
| 17 || 9 || 1 || 1 || 56 || 63 || 119 || 31 || 12 || 0.1 || 0.1 || 6.2 || 7.0 || 13.2 || 3.4 || 1.3
|- class="sortbottom"
! colspan=3| Career
! 267
! 28
! 25
! 2398
! 2149
! 4547
! 1109
! 523
! 0.1
! 0.1
! 9.0
! 8.0
! 17.0
! 4.2
! 2.0
|}

Coaching statistics

|- style="background-color: #EAEAEA"
! scope="row" style="text-align:center; font-weight:normal" | 2011
|style="text-align:center;"|
| 22 || 3 || 19 || 0 || 13.6% || 17 || 17
|-
! scope="row" style="text-align:center; font-weight:normal" | 2012
|style="text-align:center;"|
| 22 || 3 || 19 || 0 || 13.6% || 17 || 18
|- style="background-color: #EAEAEA"
! scope="row" style="text-align:center; font-weight:normal" | 2013
|style="text-align:center;"|
| 22 || 8 || 14 || 0 || 36.4% || 14 || 18
|-
! scope="row" style="text-align:center; font-weight:normal" | 2014
|style="text-align:center;"|
| 22 || 10 || 12 || 0 || 45.5% || 12 || 18
|- class="sortbottom"
! colspan=2| Career totals
! 88
! 24
! 64
! 0
! 27.3%
! colspan="2"|
|}

References

External links

 Official Website of the West Coast Eagles

1969 births
Living people
All-Australians (AFL)
Australian Football Hall of Fame inductees
Claremont Football Club players
Claremont Football Club coaches
Gold Coast Suns coaches
People educated at Carine Senior High School
Australian rules footballers from Perth, Western Australia
West Australian Football Hall of Fame inductees
John Worsfold Medal winners
West Coast Eagles players
West Coast Eagles Premiership players
Western Australian State of Origin players
Two-time VFL/AFL Premiership players